Ninon Chapelle (née Guillon-Romarin, born 15 April 1995) is a French pole vaulter. She competed in the women's pole vault at the 2017 World Championships in Athletics. She represented France in 2017 European Team Championships, where she was 3rd with a jump of 4.45m in Lille. At the 2017 European Athletics U23 Championships she finished in 5th place with a jump of 4.35m.

She holds the French indoor record with a jump of 4.72 m, set on 25 February 2018 in Clermont-Ferrand.

She married fellow French pole vaulter Axel Chapelle, they have a boy named Oscar, born in 2022.

References

External links

1995 births
Living people
French female pole vaulters
World Athletics Championships athletes for France
Place of birth missing (living people)
Mediterranean Games gold medalists for France
Mediterranean Games medalists in athletics
Athletes (track and field) at the 2018 Mediterranean Games
Mediterranean Games gold medalists in athletics
21st-century French women